James Gray (c. 1770 – 1830) was a Scottish educator, poet and linguist. While master of the high school of Dumfries, he became a friend of Robert Burns, later teaching his children. He later held posts at the high school of Edinburgh and the Belfast Academy. He then took orders in the Church of Ireland, serving as a chaplin for the East India Company in Kutch and serving as tutor to the young Rao or Prince of that province,  Deshalji II.

Life
Gray was originally master of the high school of Dumfries, and there became good friends with Robert Burns. From 1801 till 1822 he was master in the high school of Edinburgh. In 1822 he became Headmaster of the Belfast Academy.

Gray subsequently took orders in the Church of Ireland and in 1826 went out to India as chaplain in the East India Company's service at Bombay. He was eventually stationed at Bhuj in Kutch, and was entrusted by the British government with the education of the young Rao of that province Deshalji II, being, it is said, the first Christian who was ever honoured with such an appointment. Gray died at Bhuj on 25 March 1830.

Works
Gray published anonymously Cona; or the Vale of Clwyd. And other poems, London, 1814 (2nd ed., with author's name, 1816); and edited the Poems of Robert Fergusson, with a life of the poet, Edinburgh, 1821. He left in manuscript a poem on India. Another poem, entitled A Sabbath among the Mountains, is attributed to him. His Kutchi version of the Gospel of St. Matthew was printed at Bombay in 1834. A manuscript collection of his poems in Scots, now in the possession of the National Library of Scotland, is one of the earliest extant collections of Scots poetry.  It includes variant readings of several poems by Robert Henryson, as well as a collection of prayers, geographical tables and chronological tables of early Scottish history, all written in Latin.

Family
Gray married Mary Phillips of Longbridgemoor, Annandale, eldest sister of the wife of James Hogg. His family mostly settled in India. Hogg introduced Gray into the Queen's Wake, as the fifteenth bard who sang the ballad of King Edward's Dream.

References

1770 births
1830 deaths

Scottish poets
Scottish literature
Scots-language poets
19th-century poets
19th-century linguists
Scottish linguists
Scottish educators
People from Duns, Scottish Borders
19th-century Scottish people
Year of birth uncertain